The Nepal Academy, formerly known as Royal Nepal Academy, is an autonomous apex body in Nepal established for the promotion of the languages, literature, culture, philosophy and social sciences of Nepal. The academy commissions research and aims to promote the development of cultural and intellectual endeavour by coordinating national and international activities. The current chancellor of the academy is Mr. Ganga Prasad Upreti and Prof. Jagat Prasad Upadhyaya is the member secretary.

A movement for a national cultural academy of Nepal began during the 20th century, with national figures calling for its establishment, including the Nepali poet and former Minister for Education, Laxmi Prasad Devkota. The academy was established in June 1957 as the Nepal Academy of Literature and Art. It was later named as the Royal Nepal Academy following the passage of the Royal Nepal Academy Act, 1974. After the transition of Nepal into a republic in 2008, it was renamed the Nepal Academy, by provision of the Nepal Academy Act 2007 enacted by the Parliament of Nepal.

The academy annually organises the National Folk Music and Dance Festival, the National Cultural Festival, a Bhanu Jayanti celebration to commemorate the poet Bhanubhakta Acharya, stage performances and a national poetry competition.

Objectives 
The Nepal Academy was initially established with the objectives of developing and promoting Nepali literature, culture, art and science. After the changes in its Act, its objectives have been modified. The academy now works in preparing and helping prepare original and well researched works in different subjects related to languages, literature, philosophy, culture and social sciences. It also aims to confer honors and distinctions upon scholars and creative artists in recognition of their contributions in their respective fields and to work for the all-round development of various fields of knowledge at the national and international levels by encouraging people's interest in and aptitude for the process of creative thinking and production of creative works. More particularly, the objectives of Nepal Academy are as follows:

 To focus on the creation of original works in the fields of languages and their literature of Nepal, culture, philosophy and social sciences,
 To translate outstanding works in foreign languages into Nepali and other native languages and vice versa,
 To organize talks, lectures, seminars workshops, conferences, exhibitions, etc. on topics related to language, literature, philosophy culture and social sciences, and to participate in international programs of such nature,
 To maintain relations between Nepal Academy and various related international organizations,
 To honor and present awards to distinguished native and other scholars in recognition of their significant contributions to language, literature, art, crafts, music, drama, culture and social sciences,
 To promote a congenial atmosphere for facilitating the works of individuals and organizations devoted to such areas,
 To offer life and honorary memberships to distinguished scholars, artists and organizations,
 To accomplish other works related with Nepal Academy.

Departments 
A meeting of the academic council on 8 January 2019 formed eleven thematic departments.

 Department of Language (Nepali Language, Dictionary and Grammar)
 Department of Culture
 Department of Philosophy
 Department of Social Sciences
 Department of Language (Mother Tongue, Dictionary and Grammar)
 Department of Literature (Poetry)
 Department of Literature (Translation)
 Department of Literature (Prose/Fiction)
 Department of Literature (Criticism and Essays)
 Department of Literature (Mother Tongue)
 Department of Literature (Folklore and Children's Literature)

Gallery

References

External links

Academy
National academies of arts and humanities
1957 establishments in Nepal
National academies
Language regulators
Nepali literary institutions